Francisco Rodríguez (10 October 1915 – 1 June 1998) was a Mexican cyclist. He competed in the individual and team road race events at the 1948 Summer Olympics.

References

External links
 

1915 births
1998 deaths
Mexican male cyclists
Olympic cyclists of Mexico
Cyclists at the 1948 Summer Olympics
Sportspeople from Querétaro
People from Amealco de Bonfil